The European Bowling Tour (EBT) is one of three tenpin bowling tours (Europe, Americas, Asia) that form part of the ranking system of the World Tenpin Bowling Association (WTBA).

The tour is run by the European Tenpin Bowling Federation. In all the tournaments, men and women compete alongside each other, with women receiving a handicap per game. In these tournaments there is only one prize fund (not split for men & women), however some tournaments offer additional bonuses for the highest placed woman, which is often in addition to any of the regular prize money.

History
During the 1990s, there had been several attempts to develop Ten-pin bowling tours in Europe but these were usually limited to one country (The Danish Masters Tour and the German Golden Bowling Ball Tour). It wasn't until 2000 that the European Bowling Tour was launched initially holding 9 tournaments in 8 countries. It has since expanded over the course of 19 years and now consists of 13 events in 2019. The Brunswick Ballmaster Open in Helsinki is the only tournament having joined the tour since the beginning in 2000.

Tour
The format varies from tournament to tournament, but generally most tournaments on the EBT take the form of 6 games re-entry qualification, with the top 50–60 bowlers (depending on the tournament) bowling a further set of games (most commonly 4), before a final cut to either single elimination matchplay or stepladder finals.

2017

2018

2019

2020

Previous Ranking Winners
Ranking winners of the European Bowling Tour, since 2000

EBT Masters
The EBT Masters is played at a different host centre each year, usually before/after the EBT event in the same location.

Previously, qualification for this event is the top 12 men and top 12 women from the previous year's EBT ranking. Now its top 8 and top 8 women from previous years EBT ranking.

Previously, the format was a Round Robin consisting of 11 rounds of one game matches. 20 bonus points are awarded for each match won, 10 for drawn matches. The top 3 bowlers after the round robin qualify for a 3-person stepladder to determine the winner of the masters.

In 2019, top 8 men and top 8 women after conclusion of the European Bowling Tour 2018 qualified for the 2019 EBT Masters. The format is 8 games total pinfall, top 4 advance to bowl another 4 games, pinfall carrying over. Total pinfall after 12 games determined the EBT Masters champions.

The 2022 edition was the final of the EBT 2020+2021 combined. Eight men, ranging from rank 1 to 15 and seven women competed due to prior commitments.

Previous results

Notes

References

External links
 Official European Tenpin Bowling Federation website
 TalkTenPin – Bowling news from all over the world

Ten-pin bowling competitions